Kevin France is an astrophysicist and assistant professor in the Department of Astrophysical and Planetary Sciences at the University of Colorado. His research focuses on exoplanets and their host stars, protoplanetary disks, and the development of instrumentation for space-borne astronomy missions.

Early life and education 
Kevin France grew up and attended high school in Charleston, West Virginia. He then received a  B.A in Physics & Astronomy in 2000 from Boston University. After a few breaks to travel and work for Greenpeace, he earned a Ph.D. at the Johns Hopkins University in Astrophysics in 2006, working with Paul Feldman and Stephan McCandliss. At Johns Hopkins, he was the lead graduate student on two NASA/JHU rocket missions studying the ultraviolet properties of dust and H2 in galactic nebulae, a guest observer on NASA’s Far-Ultraviolet Spectroscopic Explorer and Spitzer Space Telescope missions, and played drums in the world's greatest astronomical rock band.

Research and career 
Following graduate school,  France moved to a postdoctoral position at the Canadian Institute for Theoretical Astrophysics before coming to the University of Colorado's Center for Astrophysics and Space Astronomy to join the Instrument Development Team for Hubble Space Telescope's Cosmic Origins Spectrograph (COS) with James Green. He was awarded NASA’s Nancy Grace Roman fellowship prior to joining the Department of Astrophysical and Planetary Sciences (APS) faculty at Colorado in 2013. France is presently an assistant professor in APS, the principal investigator of the Colorado Ultraviolet Rocket Group and the NASA-supported CUTE CubeSat mission, the UV spectrograph (LUMOS) lead for NASA’s LUVOIR Science and Technology Definition Team, and a founding member of the Colorado Ultraviolet Spectroscopy Program (CUSP). 

His work is aimed at exploring the potential for habitable planets to exist beyond the solar system. His specific expertise is the observation and modeling of UV spectra of planet-hosting stars, exoplanetary atmospheres, protoplanetary disks, and atomic/molecular spectra from the interstellar medium. He is a regular guest observer on Hubble, as well as other ground- and space-based observatories.  He has authored more than 110 papers in the peer-reviewed astrophysical literature.

Personal life 
Outside of work, Prof. France lives with his family outside of Boulder, Colorado. His wife, Emily France, is a  novelist and lawyer.

Recent published work 

 "Probing UV-sensitive Pathways for CN and HCN Formation in Protoplanetary Disks with the Hubble Space Telescope"
 "Near-ultraviolet Transmission Spectroscopy of HD 209458b: Evidence of Ionized Iron Beyond the Planetary Roche Lobe"
 "The Matter Beyond the Ring: The Recent Evolution of SN 1987A Observed by the Hubble Space Telescope"
 "HST spectra reveal accretion in MY Lupi"
 "Revisiting the Temperature of the Diffuse ISM with CHESS Sounding Rocket Observations"
 "Swift UVOT near-UV transit observations of WASP-121 b"
 "A Hot Ultraviolet Flare on the M Dwarf Star GJ 674"
 "Colorado Ultraviolet Transit Experiment data simulator"
 "Extreme-ultraviolet Radiation from A-stars: Implications for Ultra-hot Jupiters"
 "The Transiting Exoplanet Community Early Release Science Program for JWST"

References

External links 

 CUTE CubeSat on Twitter
 CUSP on Twitter

American astrophysicists
University of Colorado faculty
Date of birth unknown
Year of birth missing (living people)
Living people
People from Charleston, West Virginia